Eutabanus is a genus of biting horseflies of the family Tabanidae.

Distribution
Peru, Brazil.

Species
Eutabanus pictus Kröber, 1930

References

Tabanidae
Diptera of South America
Fauna of Peru
Fauna of Brazil
Taxa named by Otto Kröber
Brachycera genera